Concord High School (CHS) is a public secondary school located in unincorporated New Castle County, Delaware, United States, with a Wilmington postal address. It is one of three high schools in the Brandywine School District. There were 1,084 students enrolled in the fall for the 2019–2020 school year. Mark Mayer is the current principal of Concord High School.

History
CHS opened in 1967 in response to a rapidly rising population that produced too many students for Brandywine High School, then in the Alfred I. duPont District, to handle on its own. Upon opening, it was located on the same campus as Hanby Junior High and taught only ninth and tenth grades. Construction on CHS' own building was delayed due to a worker strike and did not open until January 1970, an entire semester after the planned date and still without its gym, auditorium, and swimming pool completed. During the delay, CHS was forced to leave Hanby and move temporarily into Brandywine High School's building; the two schools taught on a rotating basis: BHS students attended in the morning and CHS students attended in the afternoon.

Athletics 
Concord is a member of Flight B of the Blue Hen Conference in the Delaware Interscholastic Athletic Association (DIAA); the Raiders compete in Class 2A, District 1 for football. Concord fields a full slate of teams in all three sports seasons, including: crew, cross country, field hockey, football, soccer, volleyball, cheerleading, basketball, track, swimming/diving, wrestling, baseball, golf, lacrosse, and softball.
Concord's Athletic Director is Larry Jacobs. Concord, and all high schools in the Brandywine School District, are partnered with ATI Physical Therapy to provide sports medicine services.

Notable alumni
 Don Schiff(born 1955, class of 1974) Musician/rock instrumentalist
 Justin Brown (born 1991, class of 2009), CFL wide receiver
 Terri Dendy (born 1965), former track and field athlete
 Vicki Huber (born 1967), Olympic middle-distance runner
 Mary Knisely (born 1959), former middle- and long-distance running; Pan Am champion at 3,000 meters
 Luke Matheny (born 1976, class of 1993), Academy Award-winning motion picture director, writer and actor
 Scott A. McGregor (born 1956, class of 1974), technology executive and philanthropist
 Derrick Milano (born 1993, class of 2012), Grammy Award-winning songwriter
 Javor Mills (born 1979), former NFL player
 Montell Owens (born 1984, class of 2002), former NFL fullback
 Chip Reid (class of 1973), CBS news reporter 
 Adam Ruben (born 1979, class of 1997), author and Science Channel host
 Ron Suskind (born 1959), Pulitzer Prize winner (journalism) and author
 Paul Worrilow (born 1990), NFL linebacker

References

External links
 

High schools in New Castle County, Delaware
Public high schools in Delaware
1969 establishments in Delaware
Educational institutions established in 1969